Afroedura karroica, also known as the inland rock gecko or Karoo flat gecko, is a species of African gecko found in South Africa and Lesotho.

References

karroica
Reptiles of Lesotho
Reptiles of South Africa
Taxa named by John Hewitt (herpetologist)
Reptiles described in 1925